Faramana is a town in Houet Province (Hauts-Bassins Region) in  western Burkina Faso, near the border of Mali.

It is the capital of Faramana Department, which further consists of 7 villages:

 Bambe
 Biena
 Koakourima
 Kobi
 Kouni
 Siankoro
 Ty

Faramana is a bordertown near the border with Mali on the Route nationale N9, the Burkina Faso part of the trunk road from Bobo-Dioulasso to Koutiala. The border police station in Faramana is 1.2 km from the actual border (from which it is another 3.8 km to its counterpart in Mali, the border police station at Sona (Mahou rural commune, Yorosso Cercle)).

References

Populated places in the Hauts-Bassins Region